Ẹrụwa is an Edoid language of Nigeria.

Phonology
The Ẹrụwa vowel system is hardly reduced from that reconstructed for proto-Edoid.

The approximants  also have nasal allophones. The inventory is:

References

Edoid languages